Marine Aviation Logistics Squadron 13 (MALS-13) is an aviation logistics support unit of the United States Marine Corps. Known as the "Black Widows", it is currently based at Marine Corps Air Station Yuma, as part of Marine Aircraft Group 13 and the 3rd Marine Aircraft Wing.

Mission statement
Provide aviation ordnance, maintenance and logistics support, guidance and direction to Marine Aircraft Group (MAG) squadrons; as well as logistics support for navy funded equipment in the supporting Marine Wing Support Squadron (MWSS), Marine Air Control Squadron and Marine Aircraft Wing/mobile calibration complex.

Squadron organization
 Aviation logistics Information Maintenance Support Department (ALIMSD)
 Headquarters
 Aviation Supply department
 Aircraft Maintenance department
 Avionics division
 Aviation Ordnance Department

History

Marine Aviation Logistics Squadron 13 was activated on 1 March 1942 at San Diego, California as Headquarters and Service Squadron 13. The squadron saw frequent action in the Pacific theater during World War II before being deactivated on 30 November 1945.

The squadron was reactivated 15 March 1951, at Marine Corps Air Station El Toro, California, as Headquarters and Maintenance Squadron 13. During September 1966, the squadron deployed to Chu Lai Air Base, Republic of Vietnam and remained until October 1970. H&MS-13 used first the Grumman TF-9J Cougars and later Douglas TA-4F Skyhawks as fast forward air control aircraft in support of ground troops. The squadron was then relocated to El Toro, California, and assigned to the 3rd Marine Aircraft Wing until 1 October 1987, when the squadron moved to MCAS Yuma.

On 5 October 1988, the Headquarters and Maintenance Squadron within the Marine Aircraft Group (MAG) was replaced by the creation of the Marine Aviation Logistics Squadron (MALS). During the period of 10 August 1990 to October 1991, Marines from Marine Aviation Logistics Squadron 13 responded expeditiously in providing aviation logistics support during Operation Desert Storm.

Global War on Terror
In October 2002, the Squadron was tasked with providing support to six AV-8B Harrier aircraft in combat operations in Afghanistan during Operation Enduring Freedom. This detachment of MALS-13 personnel returned October 2003. On 15 January 2003, Marine Aviation Logistics Squadron 13 embarked 205 Marines and equipment aboard the USS Bonhomme Richard in support of combat operations in Southwest Asia, deploying detachments ashore with MALS-13 Forward during Operation Southern Watch and Operation Iraqi Freedom at Al Jaber Air Base, Kuwait and An Numiniyah Expeditionary Air Field, Iraq. In May 2003, Marine Aviation Logistics Squadron 13 disembarked USS Bonhomme Richard and returned to MCAS Yuma.

Awards
 Presidential Unit Citation Streamer with one bronze star 
 Navy Unit Commendation Streamer with three bronze stars
 Meritorious Unit Commendation Streamer with two bronze stars
 Asiatic–Pacific Campaign Medal with one bronze star
 World War II Victory Medal
 National Defense Service Medal with three bronze stars
 Vietnam Service Streamer with two silver and one bronze star
 Global War on Terrorism Expeditionary Medal.
 Global War on Terrorism Service Streamer.
 Vietnam Cross of Gallantry with Palm Streamer
 Vietnam Meritorious Unit Citation Civil Actions Streamer

See also

 United States Marine Corps Aviation
 Organization of the United States Marine Corps
 List of United States Marine Corps aviation support units

References

External links
 

LOG13